South Carolina Highway 19 (SC 19) is a  primary state highway in the U.S. state of South Carolina. It connects Aiken directly with the Savannah River Site and Edgefield via U.S. Route 25 (US 25).

Route description
SC 19 operates as arterial four-lane highway from Aiken to the Savannah River Site; to its north, it is a two-lane rural highway to Trenton, where it connects with US 25 and SC 121.  In Aiken's downtown area, SC 19 is signed, northbound along Chesterfield Street and Richland Avenue (on state maps, it is officially SC 19 Connector); while SC 19 southbound travels along Laurens Street/Park Avenue onto Chesterfield Street.

History
SC 19 is an original state highway, established in 1922.  Its original routing was from SC 2 in Newberry, north through Whitmire, Union, Spartanburg, Inman and Landrum, to the North Carolina state line continuing as NC 19. In 1923, it was extended south on new primary routing, through Saluda, to SC 21/SC 27 in Trenton. In 1927, US 176 was assigned to SC 19 from Newberry to the North Carolina state line; the following year it was removed from the overlap. Also in 1928, SC 19 was extended south, replacing part of SC 27 to US 1/US 78 in Aiken. In 1929 or 1930, SC 19 was extended south (again) to SC 28 north of Ellenton.

Around 1952, the Savannah River Site was established; which removed  of highway in what is now a restricted area.  By 1955, SC 19 was widened to four-lanes between the Savannah River Site and Aiken.  In 1964, SC 19 was truncated to its current northern terminus at Trenton; its routing north to Saluda was replaced by SC 121.

Major intersections

Special routes

Aiken truck route

South Carolina Highway 19 Truck (SC 19 Truck) is a  truck route that provides routing west around downtown Aiken, via SC 118, for trucks; which are not allowed in the downtown area.

Aiken connector

South Carolina Highway 19 Connector (SC 19 Conn.) is a short  hidden connector route, which is signed as northbound SC 19, between Park Avenue and Richland Avenue. Northbound SC 19 continue northbound along Richland Avenue to reconnect southbound SC 19 at Laurens Avenue.

Trenton alternate route

South Carolina Highway 19 Alternate (SC 19 Alt.) was an alternate route that partially existed within the city limits of Trenton. In 1939, its southern terminus was established at U.S. Route 25 (US 25) south-southwest of the town. It then traveled northeast across the mainline's path, on Greenhouse Road and S.E. Diggs Road. At the intersection with East Wise Street, it turned left and traveled to the northwest. Just before an intersection with the southern terminus of Thurmond Street, it began a curve to the west-northwest. At Watson Street, it turned to the right and traveled to the north-northwest. At Church Street, it turned left and resumed its west-northwest direction. It continued on Church Street until it ended at another intersection with SC 19, which existed north of the town at the time. In 1947, the southern terminus was truncated to end at its southern intersection with the mainline, removing it from Greenhouse Road. In the mid-1950s, the portion on Watson and Church streets was removed, with the alternate route using the entire length of Wise Street. Between 1965 and 1967, it was decommissioned and redesignated as SC 19 Conn. and SC 121 Conn.

Trenton connector

South Carolina Highway 19 Connector (SC 19 Conn.) is a  unsigned connector route through Trenton, via Samuel E. Diggs Road and Wise Street. Sharing a concurrency with SC 121 Conn, it has appeared on official state maps since the 1930s (possibly earlier). The routing provides a primary routing through the center of Trenton.

See also
 
 
 Central Savannah River Area

References

External links

 
 Mapmikey's South Carolina Highways Page: SC 10-19

019
Transportation in Aiken County, South Carolina
Transportation in Edgefield County, South Carolina